Lavaur Cathedral is a Roman Catholic church and former cathedral located in the town of Lavaur, Tarn, France. The cathedral is a national monument since 1911.

Until the Concordat of 1801, this was the seat of the Diocese of Lavaur, now held by the Archbishop of Albi.

The cathedral is dedicated to Saint Alan of Lavaur. The present structure dates from the 13th, 14th and 15th centuries, and has an octagonal bell-tower. A second, smaller square tower contains a 16th-century jacquemart (a statue which strikes the hours with a hammer). In the bishop's garden is the statue of Emmanuel, comte de Las Cases, one of the companions of Napoleon on Saint Helena.

On 5 February 2019, teenagers vandalised parts of the cathedral, lighting a small fire and twisting the arm of a crucifix to make it appear that Christ was dabbing.

References

External links

Location

Former cathedrals in France
Churches in Tarn (department)
Monuments historiques of Occitania (administrative region)
Brick Gothic
Gothic architecture in France